Frank Fournier (born 1948) is a French photographer. Before becoming a photographer, he studied medicine like his father, who was a surgeon. He moved to New York City and became a staff photographer at Contact Press Images in 1982 after joining the office staff in 1977. He is best known for his coverage of the 1985 Armero tragedy in Colombia; the Nevado del Ruiz volcano erupted, leading to a mudslide that killed more than 25,000 people. His portrait of Omayra Sánchez, a dying 13-year-old girl trapped under the debris of her home, won the 1985 World Press Photo award.

References

External links
Fournier's portfolio at the Contact Press Images site

1948 births
Living people
French photographers